Museum Station may refer to:

 Museum railway station, an underground commuter rail station in Sydney, Australia
 Museum station (Toronto), a station on the Toronto subway in Ontario, Canada
 Melbourne Central railway station, called Museum 1981–1995

See also
 British Museum tube station, a disused station on the London Underground
 Gimhae National Museum station, a Busan Metro station in Gimhae city, South Korea
 Muzeum (Prague Metro), a station on the Prague metro
 Muzium Negara MRT station, an underground Mass Rapid Transit station in Kuala Lumpur, Malaysia
 Science Museum station, a station on the Shenzhen Metro, China
 Southwest Museum station, a light rail station in the Los Angeles County Metro Rail system